Vaterstetten station is a railway station in the municipality of Vaterstetten, located in the Ebersberg district in Bavaria, Germany.

The halt of Vaterstetten was opened on 1 May 1897. Today, the station is served only by the S-Bahn. The island platform can be reached via an underpass.

References

Railway stations in Bavaria
Munich S-Bahn stations
Buildings and structures in Ebersberg (district)
Railway stations in Germany opened in 1897
1897 establishments in Bavaria